A protest took place on January 12, 2013 in Baku, Azerbaijan after Azerbaijani Army soldier Ceyhun Qubadov was found dead on January 7, 2013. It was first reported that the cause of death was heart attack. Qubadov's family asked for an investigation as they believed it was a murder. 

On January 10, 2013, a Facebook event was created. A day later about 13,600 joined it, the next day the number of users joined was 20,000.

Hundreds of protesters gathered at the Fountains Square on January 12 with demands of resignation of Safar Abiyev, the Azerbaijani Defense Minister. They held slogans such as "Stop killing our soldiers" and "You must answer to us."

Aftermath
Immediately after the investigation the Azerbaijani Defense Minister Safar Abiyev was fired by the order of the President of Azerbaijan Ilham Aliyev. Colonel General Zakir Hasanov took his place.

References

2013 protests
2013 in Azerbaijan
Protests in Azerbaijan
Political controversies in Azerbaijan